Kevin Patrick McDermott II (born January 12, 1990) is a former American football long snapper. He played college football at UCLA, and signed with the San Francisco 49ers as an undrafted free agent in 2013.

Early years
McDermott was born and raised in Nashville, Tennessee. He was a member of the charter class at Ensworth High School from 2005-2008.

College career
McDermott enrolled at the University of California, Los Angeles in 2008 as a walk-on tight end. In 2011, he was awarded a scholarship by then UCLA head coach Rick Neuheisel upon winning the long snapping job. During the 2011 and 2012 seasons, he started 28 straight games, played in two Pac-12 title games and two bowl games (2011 Kraft Fight Hunger Bowl and 2012 Bridgepoint Education Holiday Bowl). While at UCLA, McDermott majored in Political Science and minored in Film and Television.

Professional career

San Francisco 49ers
On May 7, 2013, McDermott signed with the San Francisco 49ers as an undrafted free agent following the 2013 NFL Draft. He started in all 16 regular season games and three playoff games, including the 2013 NFC Championship against the Seattle Seahawks. McDermott was released during final cuts before the 2014–2015 season.

Baltimore Ravens
On October 20, 2014, McDermott signed with the Baltimore Ravens after incumbent long snapper Morgan Cox tore his ACL. He played in seven regular season games before being placed on Injured Reserve.

Minnesota Vikings
On April 3, 2015, McDermott signed a two-year contract with the Minnesota Vikings. On August 8, 2016, he signed a four-year extension with the Vikings.

In Week 16 of the 2017 season, McDermott suffered a dislocated shoulder and was placed on injured reserve on December 30, 2017.

In Week 4 of the 2018 season, McDermott lost the tip of his left pinky finger in an opponent's face mask. He finished the game and played the rest of the year.

On August 11, 2019, McDermott was released by the Vikings after the team drafted Austin Cutting.

Personal life
McDermott is married to Lauren, a published author and UCLA alum. His father, Kevin Sr., played basketball at South Dakota State University from 1971–1974. His mother, Deborah, was inducted into the Broadcasting & Cable Hall of Fame in October 2013. His younger brother Conor, a former starting left tackle for the UCLA football team, was drafted by the New England Patriots in the sixth round of the 2017 NFL Draft and is currently a member of the New England Patriots . McDermott is Catholic. In 2018, McDermott graduated with his Master of Business Administration from Indiana University's Kelley School of Business. McDermott is also a certified pilot.

References

External links

 UCLA Bio
 San Francisco 49ers Bio
 Baltimore Ravens Bio

1990 births
Living people
Catholics from Tennessee
American football long snappers
Baltimore Ravens players
Denver Broncos players
Minnesota Vikings players
Players of American football from Nashville, Tennessee
San Francisco 49ers players
UCLA Bruins football players